Wijewardene or Wijewardena is a Sinhalese surname. Notable people with the surname include:

 Arthur Wijewardena (1887–1964), Ceylonese judge
 Clarence Wijewardena (1943–1996), Sri Lankan musician
 D. R. Wijewardena (1886–1950), Ceylonese businessman
 Ray Wijewardene (1924–2010), Ceylonese engineer and athlete
 Ruwan Wijewardene (born 1975), Sri Lankan politician
 Tyron Wijewardene (born 1961), Sri Lankan cricketer
 Upali Wijewardene (1938–1983), Sri Lankan businessman
 Vimala Wijewardene (1908–1985), Ceylonese politician

See also
 
 

Sinhalese surnames